Arcadea is an American synth-metal supergroup from Atlanta, formed in 2015 by Mastodon drummer Brann Dailor, Zruda guitarist Core Atoms, and guitarist Raheem Amlani. Arcadea's self-titled album was released in June 2017 via Relapse Records.

History
Arcadea was founded in 2015, by upside-down guitarist Core Atoms  and drummer Brann Dailor in Atlanta, Georgia. With the addition of guitarist Raheem Amlani, the three-piece began recording tracks at Amlani's Orange Peel Studios in Atlanta in 2015. The result was an 11-song album which was released on Relapse Records on June 16, 2017. Arcadea is the second music collaboration between Rochester, New York natives Atoms and Dailor who played in the progressive funk trio Gaylord, in the late 1990s.  

The song "Through the Eye of Pisces" from the album was featured on an ident for the British free-to-air TV channel E4 titled "Cult", which first aired in October 2018 and was created by British sci-fi artist Essy May from the production company Funtasy who also made the artwork for the band's debut album.

Musical style and influences
For all three band members, Arcadea was a departure from previous music projects in both concept and sound. While Atoms is known for his unique guitar playing style, Arcadea's premier album features no guitars—both Atoms and Amlani play only keyboards and synthesizers. For Dailor, it was an opportunity to sing lead vocals on the majority of songs in addition to drums. In an interview for Prog-Sphere Atoms explains, "Since we all have our own bands with more traditional instrumentation, we wanted to do something different but still rooted in our love of prog."
Both Dailor and Atoms credit Stevie Wonder, early Genesis, and other 70s progressive rock as influences for Arcadea.

Discography
 Arcadea (2017)

See also
Mastodon
Zruda
Gaylord

References

External links
Official website
arcadea.bandcamp.com
label.relapse.com

Heavy metal musical groups from Georgia (U.S. state)